The Arab Hellenic Bank was an internationally owned bank based in Greece.

In 1978, in advance of the founding of the bank, the Greek government granted an exemption to its usual prohibition on foreign banks owning more than 40 per cent of the equity of a Greek bank. This permitted several Arab banks to establish Arab-Hellenic Bank with 49 per cent Arab ownership. The bank was founded in 1979, with Vassilis Sarantitis, an influential lawyer and for many years chairman of the Arab-Hellenic Chamber of Commerce, as one of the founders. Ownership was 51% National Bank of Greece, 20% Kuwait Investment Office, 20% Libyan Arab Foreign Bank (a Libyan institution), and 9% other Arab investors.

As the bank was undercapitalized and the central bank of the country demanded serious capital increase, in 1993 the Libyan Arab Foreign Bank proposed a cash infusion that would take its ownership to 72%, given the other shareholders' reluctance to participate. The plan was to take advantage of the EU "single passport" rules, which would permit Arab Hellenic to open branches in London and elsewhere in the EU, while subject only to Bank of Greece supervision. The UK and US governments protested strongly and blocked the move. In 1994 the Greek government dissolved the insolvent Arab Hellenic Bank at a cost to Greece's Deposit Guarantee Fund of Euro 1.5m in payments to depositors.

Defunct banks of Greece
Banks established in 1979
Banks disestablished in 1995
1995 disestablishments in Greece
Greek companies established in 1979